André Franco Montoro (14 July 1916 – 16 July 1999) was a Brazilian politician and lawyer. He was born in São Paulo as the son of André de Blois Montoro and Tomásia Alijostes. He was a senator and governor of São Paulo. He was a member of several parties, such as PDC, MDB, PMDB and one of the founders of PSDB. He was also a law philosopher and a professor at PUC-SP, who wrote several law books.

Montoro is credited as being one of the key figures in the Diretas Já movement, along with Tancredo Neves and Ulysses Guimarães, which helped to bring about the return of direct elections to Brazil.

The São Paulo-Guarulhos International Airport is named after him.

Montoro government 
Montoro's government decentralized the state into 42 regions, leaving school meals to municipalities. He built thousands of kilometers of vaccine roads and expanded water and sewage networks, in addition to building (on average) one school a week during his tenure. In his government, he had the creation of the first secretariat for the environment and the first police station for the defense of women.

References

1916 births
1998 deaths
People from São Paulo
Governors of São Paulo (state)
Brazilian people of Italian descent
Brazilian people of Spanish descent
University of São Paulo alumni
Members of the Federal Senate (Brazil)
Members of the Chamber of Deputies (Brazil) from São Paulo
Members of the Legislative Assembly of São Paulo
Christian Democratic Party (Brazil) politicians
Brazilian Democratic Movement politicians
Brazilian Social Democracy Party politicians
20th-century Brazilian lawyers